Denis Nikolayevich Klopkov (born 4 March 1986) is a Russian former professional football player.

Club career
He made his Russian Football National League debut for FC Volga Ulyanovsk on 6 April 2008 in a game against FC Alania Vladikavkaz.

Personal life
His wife's name is Lilia and he has a daughter. His ethnic group is Chuvashian.

External links
 

1986 births
Sportspeople from Ulyanovsk
Living people
Russian footballers
Association football midfielders
FC Salyut Belgorod players
FC Khimki players
FC Fakel Voronezh players
Russian expatriate footballers
Expatriate footballers in Kazakhstan
FC Zhetysu players
FC Luch Vladivostok players
FC Armavir players
FC Nosta Novotroitsk players
FC Volga Ulyanovsk players